Covenant Theological Seminary, informally called Covenant Seminary, is the denominational seminary of the Presbyterian Church in America (PCA). Located in Creve Coeur, Missouri, it trains people to work as leaders in church positions and elsewhere, especially as pastors, missionaries, and counselors. It does not require all students to be members of the PCA, but it is bound to promote the teachings of its denomination. Faculty must subscribe to the system of biblical doctrine outlined in the Westminster Standards.

History

The seminary was established in 1956 as a sister institution to Covenant College, founded the previous year in Pasadena, California. Both were agencies of the Bible Presbyterian Church (Columbus Synod). The institution's founders believed that their denomination needed a strong theological school to resist liberalizing influences in American Evangelicalism. The college and seminary shared the a president and campus in St. Louis until the college outgrew its space and moved to Lookout Mountain, Georgia, in 1964. They formally became two separate institutions in 1966. 

Denominational mergers over the ensuing decades made the schools part of the Evangelical Presbyterian Church (EPC), then the Reformed Presbyterian Church, Evangelical Synod (RPCES), and finally, in 1982—through what is known as the "joining and receiving" with the RPCES—the Presbyterian Church in America (PCA), which elects and oversees the work of the seminary's board of trustees.

Over its 65 years, the seminary has continued to grow in size and reputation, and is now home to a student body (both on campus and online) drawn from nearly every U.S. state and many other nations. More than 4,500 Covenant Seminary graduates now serve as pastors, church planters, missionaries, campus ministers, counselors, Bible translators, and educators, and in many other ministry and non-vocational ministry capacities in multiple denominations and in all 50 states and 100 countries.

Academics
The seminary is accredited by the Higher Learning Commission and Association of Theological Schools in the United States and Canada. It offers several academic degrees: Master of Divinity (M.Div.), Master of Arts (MA), Master of Theology (Th.M.), and Doctor of Ministry (D.Min.).

The seminary is doctrinally committed to the Reformed faith and Covenant theology, and it believes the Bible to be the inspired and inerrant word of God.

The seminary is also home to the Francis Schaeffer Institute, which encourages Christians to engage contemporary culture in a compassionate way with the truth-claims of the gospel.

Covenant publishes Covenant magazine annually and Presbyterion, an academic theological journal, semiannually.

President 
In July 2021, the Rev. Dr. Thomas C. Gibbs became the sixth president of Covenant Seminary, After graduating from Auburn University, Gibbs served as a youth director at Faith Presbyterian Church in Birmingham, Alabama. After earning a Master of Divinity degree from Covenant Seminary in 1997, he started a new Reformed University Fellowship (RUF) chapter at Baylor University, then served as senior pastor at Redeemer Presbyterian Church of San Antonio, Texas, for 19 years. 

Previous Covenant presidents include: Robert G. Rayburn (1956–1977), William S. Barker (1977–1985), Paul Kooistra (1985–1994), Bryan Chapell (1994–2010; chancellor, 2011–12), and Mark Dalbey (interim president, 2012–13, permanent, 2013-2021).

Notable alumni
Kenneth Bae, US missionary, author, activist
William S. Barker, theologian, educator
Jerram Barrs, author, educator, pastor, Founder of Francis Schaffer Institute
Anthony Bradley, theologian, educator, author
Bryan Chapell, theologian, educator, pastor 
Ligon Duncan, pastor
Ted K. Lim, pastor, educator, former president of Asian Center for Theological Studies in Korea
Matt Morginsky, Christian singer
Nancy Pearcey, Christian author
Bong Rin Ro, missiologist, former executive secretary of Asia Graduate School of Theology
Phillip Sandifer, singer/songwriter
Dane Ortlund, pastor, author

References

External links
 

Seminaries and theological colleges in Missouri
Presbyterianism in Missouri
Presbyterian universities and colleges in the United States
Universities and colleges in St. Louis
Reformed church seminaries and theological colleges
Presbyterian Church in America
Educational institutions established in 1956
Buildings and structures in St. Louis County, Missouri
1956 establishments in Missouri